The 2016–17 CEV Champions League was the 58th edition of the highest level European volleyball club competition organised by the European Volleyball Confederation.

Qualification

Pools composition

League round

All times are local

Pool A

|}

|}

Pool B

|}

|}

Pool C

|}

|}

Pool D

|}

|}

Pool E

|}

|}

Third place ranking

|}

Playoffs

All times are local

Playoff 12

|}

First leg

|}

Second leg

|}

Playoff 6

|}

First leg

|}

Second leg

|}

Final Four
Organizer:  Sir Sicoma Colussi Perugia
 Place: Rome
All times are Central European Summer Time (UTC+02:00).

Semifinals

|}

3rd place match

|}

Final

|}

Final standings

Awards

Most Valuable Player
  Maxim Mikhaylov (Zenit Kazan)
Best Setter
  Luciano De Cecco (Sir Sicoma Colussi Perugia)
Best Outside Spikers
  Wilfredo León (Zenit Kazan)
  Ivan Zaytsev (Sir Sicoma Colussi Perugia)

Best Middle Blockers
  Marko Podraščanin (Sir Sicoma Colussi Perugia)
  Artem Volvich (Zenit Kazan)
Best Opposite Spiker
  Aleksandar Atanasijević (Sir Sicoma Colussi Perugia)
Best Libero
  Jenia Grebennikov (Cucine Lube Civitanova)

References

External links
 2017 CEV Volleyball Champions League

CEV Champions League
2016 in volleyball
2017 in men's volleyball